Soble (/ˈsoʊbəl/) is a surname. Notable people with the surname include:

Alan Soble (born 1947), American philosopher 
Jack Soble (1903–1967), Lithuanian-American spy
Ken Soble (1911–1966), Canadian broadcasting executive
Myra Soble (1904–1992), American spy, wife of Jack